The First World War centenary was the centenary of the First World War, which began on 28 July 2014 with a series of commemorations of the outbreak of the war organised across the continent of Europe, and ended on 11 November 2018 with the centenary of the 1918 Armistice, during which multiple commemorations were held globally, including an international ceremony in Paris.

Participating countries

Australia

In Australia, the occasion is known as the Anzac Centenary. Committees planning the event included the National Commission on the Commemoration of the Anzac Centenary and the Anzac Centenary Advisory Board.  The government had budgeted $83.5M for a seven-year programme which included commemorative events in Australia and overseas; educational activities and resources; and refurbishments of galleries and war graves. The Brisbane City Council has spent $13.4 million to refurbish the Shrine of Remembrance, Brisbane located in ANZAC Square and $1 million revitalising 31 suburban war memorials. Many commemorative events were organised by governments and other organisations. In 2015 the Australian Government committed a further $100M to the Anzac Centenary for the creation of the Sir John Monash Centre, unveiled on Anzac Day 2018. It is the Western Front's most expensive visitor centre. During the centenary of the First World War, Australia is said to have spent more than any other country put together to celebrate the Anzacs.

Belgium
The centenary of World War I was marked by a program of exhibition, lectures and academic research focusing on the theme of Belgian involvement in the conflict and the occupation. The Royal Museum of the Armed Forces and Military History in Brussels hosted an exhibition titled "Expo 14–18: It's Our History" from 2014 to 2015.

Bosnia and Herzegovina
The city of Sarajevo, where the assassination of Archduke Franz Ferdinand took place, organized a commemoration in the period 21–28 June 2014. The event was named "Sarajevo, heart of Europe".

Filmmaker Emir Kusturica announced an initiative to hold a ceremony on 28 June 2014, in which a re-trial of Gavrilo Princip would be started. The motivation behind the initiative was that Austria-Hungary never ratified the annexation of Bosnia and Herzegovina, and that a verdict of high treason therefore should be considered illegal. Kusturica said the assassination of Ferdinand by Princip was "a political murder, but definitely not high treason. If Princip was convicted of murder, it wouldn't have been possible to sentence him to lifetime imprisonment". Furthermore, he planned to exhibit letters written by Oskar Potiorek, arguing that they proved that a war was planned long before the Sarajevo assassination.

Canada
The centenary of the First World War was commemorated on 3 August, the date of the German declaration of war on France. A wreath-laying ceremony was held at the National War Memorial, before continuing at the Canadian War Museum. During the ceremony, Prime Minister Stephen Harper announced the permanent extension of the Ceremonial Guard's sentry hours, from Vimy Ridge Day to Remembrance Day.

Other tributes were also held in Halifax, where lights were shut off at major landmarks, and an ecumenical service at the Basilica of St. John the Baptist in St. John's. The event was also commemorated in Toronto in an event organised by the tourism office for Flanders, where a group of men in newsboy costumes distributed fictitious historical newspaper describing the major events of the war. The centenary of the war was also the theme of the 93rd annual Warrior's Day Parade, held on 10 August at Toronto's Canadian National Exhibition.

Czech Republic
The Czech Radio ran several accounts on the social networks where they are remembering all the events from the World War I day-by-day. That was accompanied by a special website with an archive of radio programmes with stories from World War I.

The Czech Republic was part of Austria-Hungary.

Denmark
The cultural network "Golden Days" planned a commemoration in September 2014, "1914, the Gateway to Modern Europe".

Denmark remained neutral during World War I and did not take part in the warfare. The biggest event from a Danish perspective is the reunification with Northern Schleswig (Sønderjylland) in 1920. After the Second War of Schleswig in 1864, Denmark was forced to cede Schleswig and Holstein to Prussia. In 1918, the Versailles powers offered to return the region of Schleswig-Holstein to Denmark. After the Schleswig Plebiscites Northern Schleswig (Sønderjylland) was recovered by Denmark in 1920. The reunion day (Genforeningsdag) is celebrated every 15 June on Valdemarsdag.

France

In France, the government carried out a policy of national remembrance.  An early start was made in 2011 with the opening of Le Musée de la Grande Guerre in Meaux on Armistice Day. France set up an official board for the commemoration of the centenary under the name of Mission du Centenaire.

A war memorial, entitled L'Anneau de la mémoire ("Ring of Memory"), was opened on 11 November 2014 in Ablain-Saint-Nazaire. It is the first major memorial in particular to list casualties alphabetically without regards to nationality or rank.

As part of the commemorations, the idea of a Paris Peace Forum was conceived by Justin Vaïsse and Pascal Lamy, and promoted by President Emmanuel Macron. The first edition was held from 11 to 13 November 2018 following an international-level military ceremony at the Arc de Triomphe, and went on to be held annually in the city during November. Over 70 heads of state and government participated in the 2018 commemorations.

Ireland
The centenary of the First World War was marked in Ireland. A cross of sacrifice was erected in Glasnevin in Dublin, which also included a joint Irish-British commemoration ceremony.  A season of First World War programmes was also broadcast on RTÉ.

Kenya
The Centenary commemorations were marked primarily in Taita Taveta County, with events starting from 16 August 2014 and going on for another five years. Kenya, known as British East Africa during World War I, borders Tanzania, then known as German East Africa. Taita Taveta County was therefore the site of several important battles in what was known as the East African Campaign of World War I. The German Schutztruppe occupied Taveta and built fortified outposts with an intention of blocking the British from using the Voi-Taveta Railway.
Major battle sites and commemoration locations include:
 The German outpost on Salaita Hill where a big battle was fought on 12 February 1916, followed by a German retreat towards the Kenya-Tanzania border.
 Latema and Rianta Hills where a major battle was fought between 12 and 16 March 1916, the final World War I battle in British colonial territory. 
 Mile 27 on the Voi-Maktau Railway 
 Fortifications at Maktau 
 Mashoti Fort 
 Mbuyuni 
Commemorations also took place at the Voi, Maktau and Taveta Commonwealth War Graves. 
The commemorations were held in conjunction with the National Museums of Kenya, the Commonwealth War Graves Commission and the Kenya Wildlife Service.

New Zealand
New Zealand government agencies and other organisations worked together on commemorations to mark the centenary, which was entitled as WW100. The commemorations were led by the Minister for Arts, Culture and Heritage, Maggie Barry. A WW100 Programme Office was established by the Ministry for Culture and Heritage along with the Ministry of Foreign Affairs and Trade, the New Zealand Defence Force and the Department of Internal Affairs.

New Zealand's centenary commemorations honoured those who fought, but also told the stories of the people who remained at home. $17 million in lottery funding has been allocated by the Lottery Grants Board to commemorate the First World War Centenary.

The New Zealand Government’s key centenary projects included the development of the Pukeahu National War Memorial Park in Wellington, an education/interpretation centre at the National War Memorial, a series of new histories, and the Ngā Tapuwae New Zealand First World War Trails in Gallipoli and along the Western Front.

A First World War Centenary Panel was established, chaired by Brian Roche of New Zealand Post. The Panel's role was to advocate for the centenary, attract sponsorship or philanthropic support for centenary projects, coordinate with any equivalent bodies overseas, particularly Australia; and provide advice to the government on the centenary commemorations. Dame Anne Salmond, Bob Harvey, Dr Monty Soutar, Matthew Te Pou and Sir Peter Jackson were all involved.

Several media commentators have criticized different aspects of the official Centenary commemorations. Professor Bryce Edwards noted on 24 April 2015: "As the nation moves into commemorating the Anzac Day centenary, there are growing signs of WWI overload and fatigue."

Slovakia 

On the occasion of the 100th anniversary of the end of the war, an international project entitled Tree of Peace was established. The Tree of Peace (Slovak: Strom pokoja, Russian: Дерево мира, German: Der Friedensbaum) is an international project that originated in Slovakia, and its main goal is to promote a message of peace by planting Trees of Peace on every continent. The first tree was planted on 28 September 2018 at a military cemetery in the village of Velkrop in the Stropkov district in northeast Slovakia. The war cemetery in Veľkrop is the biggest First World War cemetery in Slovakia. 8,662 soldiers of the Austro-Hungarian and Russian armies have found a final resting place here, of whom only 11 from the total buried known by their names. The cemetery originated after being moved from the front.

By 2020, thirteen Peace Trees have been planted in important places regarding military and world history, including the National WWI Museum and Memorial of the United States in Kansas City, the Imperial Villa in Bad Ischl, the monument to the victims of the 71st Trenčín Infantry Regiment in Kragujevac, the Monument to the Battle of the Nations in Leipzig, and the palace complex of the Tsarskoe Selo State Museum in St. Petersburg. Six trees have been planted in Slovakia and others in Germany, Serbia, Austria, Poland, Russia, the United States and the United Kingdom. The thirteenth tree was planted by the President of the Slovak Republic, Madam Zuzana Čaputová. The umbrella organization for the Tree of Peace project is the Servare et Manere, a civic association founded in Slovakia.

An official Congressional Record exists of the proceedings and debates of the United States Congress, involving a planned planting of a Tree of Peace in Kansas City, published in Washington, D.C. on 20 June 2019, Vol. 165, No. 104.

Turkey
Official Anzac Day commemorations were held in Gallipoli, Turkey, over two days beginning on 25 April 2015 to mark the 100th anniversary of the Gallipoli landing. The commemoration was attended by the following leaders:
Kamalesh Sharma, Commonwealth Secretary-General
 David Cameron, Prime Minister of the United Kingdom
 Tony Abbott, Prime Minister of Australia
 John Key, Prime Minister of New Zealand
 Recep Tayyip Erdoğan, President of Turkey
A service was held during the dawn of 25 April to remember fallen soldiers.

United Kingdom

In the United Kingdom, the Imperial War Museum (IWM) led a national programme of commemorative events and planned new galleries for the occasion (www.1914.org).  In May 2010 the museum launched its First World War Centenary Partnership Programme.  Partner organisations receive access to  IWM collections objects and expertise, and to digital resources, branding and a collaborative extranet. By November 2011, 330 national and international organisations had become partners. The museum also opened a new permanent First World War gallery at its London branch on 19 July 2014, as part of a £35 million redevelopment of the building.

In November 2011, it was announced that Prime Minister David Cameron had appointed Andrew Murrison MP as his special representative for First World War centenary commemorations. On 11 October 2012, Cameron announced £50 million to fund national centenary commemorations. The anniversaries of Britain's declaration of war on Germany, the opening of the Battle of the Somme, the Battle of Jutland, and the November 1918 Armistice were planned to be marked by national commemorations. The redevelopment of the Imperial War Museum, where Cameron delivered his speech, will be supported by an additional £5 million. A further £5.3 million will fund visits to Western Front battlefields by pupils from English schools. The Heritage Lottery Fund will provide £15 million to community projects, led by young people, to conserve local heritage associated with the war. In addition the preservation of the former Royal Navy light cruiser HMS Caroline, which served at the Battle of Jutland, will be supported by a grant of up to £1 million.

The Heritage Lottery Fund provided funding to educational projects in fields such as local history, online access to museums and archives, youth heritage projects – such as the Great War Live archive site, which showcases the war day by day as it happens, family history, the preservation of war memorials, and the conservation of historic artefacts.

The BBC planned a First World War centenary season of around 2,500 hours of television, radio and online programming over four years. The programming included documentaries, drama, arts and music, commemorative programmes and programmes for children and schools.

On 14 January 2014, the National Archives released a first batch of digitised British Army war diaries. The same day, the National Archives, together with Imperial War Museums and Zooniverse launched 'Operation War Diary', a crowdsourcing project to tag data on each diary page.

The installation Blood Swept Lands and Seas of Red at the Tower of London, by Paul Cummins and Tom Piper, was especially popular — over five million people visited it before it closed in November 2014, with calls for it to be extended.  Most of the ceramic poppies were sold to the public and special features from it have been preserved to go on tour and then be displayed in the Imperial War Museum. Artistic reception was mixed but the Queen praised the exhibit in her Christmas message and the artists were honoured in the new year. A similar tribute, Beyond the Deepening Shadow, in which 10,000 flames were lit, again at the Tower of London, and designed by Piper, was installed to mark the centenary of the end of the war. It ran nightly, ending on Armistice Day (11 November) 2018.

The Shrouds of the Somme was laid out at Queen Elizabeth Olympic Park from 8 to 18 November 2018 to commemorate the 72,396 servicemen from the British Commonwealth with no known grave recorded at Thiepval Memorial as missing presumed dead in the Battle of the Somme; the work comprises 72,396 small human figurines, each separately wrapped in a calico shroud which was cut and sewn by hand. All of them were held in the presence of about 2,000 invited guests.

United States
The United States World War One Centennial Commission was established in 2013. The Commission planned, developed, and executed programs, projects, and activities to commemorate the centennial of World War One.  A large part of its mandate was to encourage private organizations and State and local governments to organize and participate in activities that commemorate the centennial of World War I and to facilitate and coordinate activities throughout the U.S.  The Commission also served as a "clearinghouse" for information about events and plans for commemoration.

International organizations

European Broadcasting Union (EBU)
The European Broadcasting Union (EBU) organised a concert in Sarajevo with the Vienna Philharmonic Orchestra. It took place in a library that had recently been renovated following the destruction wrought by the Yugoslav conflict, and which is adjacent to the site of the assassination of Archduke Franz Ferdinand, which triggered the war.

In 2018, the EBU oversaw a 'Concert for Peace' produced by two of its members, France Télévisions and Zweites Deutsches Fernsehen (ZDF), held at the Royal Opera of Versailles and again performed by the Vienna Philharmonic Orchestra, for the purpose of commemorating the centenary of the end of the war.

European Union
The European Union marked the occasion with a gathering of leaders of the 28 EU member states in Ypres, during which they stood together at the Menin Gate while the Last Post was played. A minute of silence was also held for the fallen.

Europeana
Europeana had three digital projects to commemorate the First World War across Europe. A range of materials was freely available on the web.
 Europeana Collections 1914–1918, which made available 425,000 items from European libraries.
 Europeana 1914–1918, which digitized and made available stories and objects brought to collection days across Europe.
 EFG1418, the European Film Gateway collection of films and related documents from the war.

Red Cross
The Red Cross had an archive of records about the twenty million soldiers that were captured or buried by other countries. It planned to put all these paper records online for the centenary.

References

External links

Centenary News
Commemorative website from the French Ministry of Culture discussing archaeology of the first world war
 United States World War One Centennial Commission
First World War Centenary  at the Imperial War Museum
Anzac Centenary
First World War Centenary Commemorations Events in Kenya  in Taita Taveta Battlefields
Europeana Collections 1914–1918
Browse Europeana Collections 1914–1918
 Andrei Zamoiski: Centenary (Belarus), in: 1914-1918-online. International Encyclopedia of the First World War.
 Gueorgui Peev: Centenary (Bulgaria), in: 1914-1918-online. International Encyclopedia of the First World War.
 Roberto Mazza: Centenary (Israel/Palestine), in: 1914-1918-online. International Encyclopedia of the First World War.
 Petra Svoljsak: Centenary (Slovenia), in: 1914-1918-online. International Encyclopedia of the First World War.
Nationalism and the First World War Centenary H-Nationalism

2014 establishments
2018 disestablishments
2010s in Europe
2010s in military history